Kani Zard (also Romanized as Kānī Zard) is a village in Baryaji Rural District, in the Central District of Sardasht County, West Azerbaijan Province, Iran. At the 2006 census, its population was 758, in 151 families.

References 

Populated places in Sardasht County